The Kawasaki Ninja ZX-6R is a 636 cc class motorcycle in the Ninja sport bike series from the Japanese manufacturer Kawasaki.
It was introduced in 1995, and has been constantly updated throughout the years in response to new products from Honda, Suzuki, and Yamaha. The ZX series is what was known as the Ninja line of Kawasaki motorcycles in the 1980s and still carries the name today.

History 
Kawasaki introduced the ZX-6R in 1995 with very similar looks and features like the 1994 introduced ZX-9R, including the ram-air intake that had been developed by Kawasaki since the 1990 ZX-11 (ZZ-R1100).

There was a major revamp of the ZX-6R in 1998 with the Launch of the G series. The G series saw no increase in displacement but power went from 100 BHP to 108 BHP thanks to the newly designed airbox. The fairing was revamped, but it retained a similar design for the headlight, air intakes and windscreen. In 2000, the first J series replaced the G, increasing power to 112 BHP by increasing the compression ratio from 11.8:1 to 12.8:1. The J series sported a couple of modernisations including a 180 section rear tire, second headlight, uprated generator and stick coils (coil on plug) replacing the traditional coil with HT lead.

With strong competition from Honda's CBR600F4i, Suzuki's GSX-R600, and Yamaha's YZF-R6, Kawasaki decided on an unusual move for the late 2002 models. This version used the J series bodywork with the only notable differences being the "636" stickers on the fairing. For riders who needed bikes for displacement-restricted racing, Kawasaki also made available a limited production  version, the Ninja ZX-6RR, but the  ZX-6R would be their main mass production middleweight sport bike.

In 2003, there were a number of changes to the ZX-6R, or ZX636 as it is often referred. The engine was fuel injected and engine speed was raised around 500 RPM which resulted in a slight gain in power. Radial-mounted four-piston brakes replaced the previous six-piston brakes and the front forks were now inverted. Chassis improvements resulted in higher rigidity and less weight. An all digital instrument panel was also introduced and a larger ram-air intake inlet moved to the center over the headlight, running through the headstock. The bike, designation B1H, carried over to the 2004 model year with just color scheme changes. The ZX-6RR won the Supersport category award for Masterbike 2004 and placed third overall.

In 2005, Kawasaki again revamped the ZX-6R. The frame and swingarm were updated, but the main changes from its predecessor lay in the design. The aluminum frame was now painted flat black, fairings were more round, and integrated turn signals were used (euro model). The exhaust was now centrally under the seat (a configuration commonly referred to as an undertail exhaust). Most of these changes were mirrored in the 599 cc ZX-6RR. For the second year in a row, the ZX-6RR again won the Supersport category award for Masterbike 2005 and placed third overall. The bike carried over to the 2006 model year with minor suspension changes and new color schemes.

After four years of offering their 636 cc ZX-6R for street use and an entirely separate 599 cc ZX-6RR for displacement-restricted racing classes, Kawasaki offered only one ZX-6R for 2007, and it displaced 599 cc. Previous years of the ZX-6R's engines were all built from the same basic design, but the all-new engine for 2007 was redesigned from the crankcase up. In following with what their competitors had already been doing, Kawasaki's new engine featured a stacked gear arrangement in which the crankshaft, primary drive and countershaft are placed in a triangular format for a shorter, more compact powerplant. Now about 40 mm smaller in both length and width and it is said to yield greater cornering clearance. By using a former 125 cc Grand Prix racer as the ZX-6R's chief development rider, Tomomi Manako, Kawasaki claims a focus has been put on track usage. Frame, swingarm, suspension, brakes, and body were completely redesigned and the bike shares very few parts from the previous model. The ZX-6R was carried over to the 2008 model year with just color scheme changes.

For 2009, Kawasaki dramatically changed the appearance of the ZX-6R to match the more angular look of the ZX-10R. Kawasaki claims the new ZX-6R is 10 kg lighter than the previous model. The greatest changes for 2009 were the redesign of the exhaust, now carried low and not requiring the thick under-seat construction of 2008 and especially the introduction of the Showa Big Piston Fork (BPF) suspension for a more progressive brake-dive. The 2010 ZX-6R is changing once more with an improved engine and slipper clutch. The exhaust pre-chamber has more space and also limits exhaust noise giving the rider a smoother ride. New double bore intake funnels features two available heights which gives performance upgrades in both high and low engine speeds. The front seat is now lower.

For 2013, Kawasaki reintroduced the ZX-6R 636, while still continuing to sell the regular, 599 cc 2009-2012 ZX-6R at a lower price.

The 2013 ZX-6R 636 is a brand new bike. Engine displacement has again been increased to 636 cc, with two fuel maps available to choose via a switch on the handlebars. The new version has increased torque and horsepower, and the increased performance is apparent at lower RPM. While the tail is to the one in the 2009-2012 model, it features new front and side fairings, new dash, new frame, new Showa BPF-SFF front suspension, Kawasaki Traction Control (KTRC) with three modes (sport, city and rain) as standard equipment, and Kawasaki Intelligent anti-lock Brake System (KIBS) available as option.

In Showa's Big Piston Fork - Separate Function Fork (BPF-SFF) suspension, the left leg bar a bigger and stronger spring than the right one, with regulated pre-load. The right bar has bigger oil damper section, with regulated rebound and compression damping. According to the manufacturer, this asymmetric design provides a reduction of the friction inside the fork, significant mass loss and more friendly response of suspension. The KTRC system uses manipulation of the ignition timing on all 3 traction control modes, while mode 3 (rain mode) also uses a separate throttle controlled by the on-board electronics, to allow faster reaction for wheel over-spin on slippery surfaces. Traction control and power modes can be adjusted or turned off whenever the throttle is closed, even while riding the bike. The bike is sold without a steering damper, as customer complaints about the OEM steering damper on previous models prompted Kawasaki to discontinue this feature on subsequent models.

The ZX-6R 636 for 2019 has some updates consisting of: Euro4 compliance, KQS quickshifter (up only), updated bodywork and seat, LED headlights and updated dashboard.

Through the 2020 model year, Kawasaki sold only the  displacement Ninja ZX-6R in most markets, while in Japan the  version continues to be sold alongside the 636 since the model year 2003 onwards.

Motorsport 
Andrew Pitt won the Supersport World Championship in 2001 with a ZX-6R, and Kenan Sofuoğlu won it in 2012, 2015 and 2016. Also, Kawasaki won the Supersport World Championship manufacturers title in 2013, 2015 and 2016.

Specifications

References

External links 

 2007 ZX-6R preview from Motorcycle Daily
 2007 Kawasaki ZX-6R – First Ride from Motorcycle USA
 First Ride: Year 2000 Kawasaki ZX-6R from Motorcycle.com
 Kawasaki ZX-6R reviews Road tests of every Kawasaki ZX-6R model since 1995
 2003 ZX6RR Review from SportRider

Ninja ZX-6R
Sport bikes
Motorcycles introduced in 1995